Adamowicz is a Polish surname; it may refer to:

 Adamowicz brothers Benjamin (born Bolesław) Adamowicz (1898–1979) and Joseph (born Józef) Adamowicz (1893–1970) Adamowicz, Poland-born American businessmen and amateur aviators known for their transatlantic flight in 1934
 Irena Adamowicz (1910–1973), Polish scout and resistance worker during World War II
 Katarzyna Adamowicz (born 1993), Polish chess player
 Laurent Adamowicz, French businessman, entrepreneur, lecturer, author, and public health advocate.
 Magdalena Adamowicz, (born 1973), Polish lawyer and the widow of Paweł Adamowicz
 Paweł Adamowicz (1965–2019), Polish politician, mayor of Gdańsk
 Tony Adamowicz (1941–2016), American racing driver